James Doona (born 15 January 1998) is an Irish professional footballer, currently playing for League of Ireland First Division side Longford Town.

Club career

Youth career
Raised in School Street in The Liberties, Doona started playing football with Lourdes Celtic. His form there earned him moves to two of the country's top schoolboy clubs, Crumlin United and then Stella Maris. Doona's took his first step towards League of Ireland football by signing for Inchicore club St Patrick's Athletic's youth setup. In August 2015 Doona signed for Shamrock Rovers Under 19's squad, where he played for the 2015 short season and the also 2016 season with them.

Shamrock Rovers

2015 & 2016 seasons
Doona's first involvement with the Shamrock Rovers first team was on 8 September 2015 when he played in their 1–0 Leinster Senior Cup. He made two more first team appearances for the first team that season, both in the Leinster Senior Cup, a semi final win over Bohemians, playing alongside Damien Duff as well as playing in the final as Rovers lost 3–1 to Dundalk. Doona's first league appearance in senior football came on 29 May 2016 when he came off the bench in a 1–1 draw with Finn Harps at the Tallaght Stadium. His first senior goal came on 19 August 2016 when he scored the fifth goal in a 5–0 away win over Athlone Town in the FAI Cup. In all, Doona played in 12 games in 2016, scoring one goal.

2017 season
2017 saw Doona become a full member of the first team squad as he no longer had any involvement with the Under 19's. This allowed manager Stephen Bradley to use Doona a lot more and this saw him feature in 27 games, scoring 6 goals. He scored an important 120th minute winner over Cork City in the semi-final of the League Cup and also played in the final as Rovers lost 3–0 to Dundalk. He was mainly used off the bench however as he started in just 4 of his 18 league appearances as well as being an unused substitute in all 4 of Rovers UEFA Europa League campaign as they played against Stjarnan of Iceland before being knocked out by FK Mladá Boleslav of the Czech Republic. In the off-season, Doona trained with Tranmere Rovers who were set to sign the 19 year old but a move never materialised.

St Patrick's Athletic

2018 season
On 12 December 2017, it was announced that Doona had signed for his boyhood club from his native Inchicore, St Patrick's Athletic. The transfer was seen as a shock move among League of Ireland circles but upon signing, Doona spoke of how he lives only 2 minutes from Richmond Park as well as speaking about how he regularly attended games before starting his own career and has fond memories of Chris Forrester, Christy Fagan and Killian Brennan's performances on the way to the club's 2013 title win. He made his debut in a 3–1 Leinster Senior Cup win away to Bray Wanderers on 4 February 2018. Doona got his first assists for the Saints when he set up two goals for Michael Leahy in extra time of the Saints 4–4 League Cup draw with Dundalk at Richmond Park. Doona played the full 120 minutes and scored his penalty in the shootout as his side lost 8–7 on penalties. Doona struggled for game time under Liam Buckley but the manager left the club in September, with his assistant Ger O'Brien restoring Doona to the team towards the end of the season. On the last day of the season, Doona scored his first goals for the club as he scored twice in a 5–0 win over Derry City in front of the onlooking newly appointed Saints manager Harry Kenny. This display impressed Kenny enough to offer Doona a new contract for the 2019 season on 23 November 2018.

2019 season
Doona's first goal of the season came in the League Cup, scoring in a 2–1 loss at home to Dundalk on 1 April 2019. On 22 October 2019 Doona came off the bench away to Derry City in the 77th minute and scored 2 goals within 5 minutes to give his side a 3–1 win, his first league goals of the season. This earned him his first start of the season, away to Champions Dundalk on the last day of the season. It was announced on 6 November 2019 that Doona had been released following the end of his contract. Doona played in two friendly games with the PFAI's out of contract squad, scoring in a 5–1 win over Rochdale XI and another in a 1–0 win over Home Farm.

On 8 January 2020, it was announced that Doona had signed a new one year contract with St Patrick's Athletic, with manager Stephen O'Donnell changing his mind on Doona having originally allowed him to leave the club. Doona started the 2020 season off when he scored 2 goals in a 5–1 pre-season friendly win over Cobh Ramblers on 16 January 2020 and another against Galway United on 4 February. The season proved to be a difficult one for Doona, as the league season was halved due to the Coronavirus pandemic which also saw the League Cup and Leinster Senior Cup abandoned. As a result of this, Doona struggled for game time, playing in 8 of the club's 19 league and cup games, starting just 1 of them as his side finished in 6th place, missing out on European football on the final day of the season.

Athlone Town
Doona signed for League of Ireland First Division side Athlone Town on the 21st December 2020, ahead of the 2021 season. Doona made a total of 25 appearances for the club, scoring 6 goals as they finished in 7th place.

Cork City
On 6 November 2021, Doona signed for fellow League of Ireland First Division club Cork City ahead of the 2022 season. He made his debut for the club in a 6–0 win over Bray Wanderers at the Carlisle Grounds on 18 February 2022. Doona's first goal for the club came on 9 May 2022, when he scored a 25th minute penalty in a 3–0 win away to Treaty United in the Munster Senior Cup Semi Final. Doona made 19 appearances in all competitions for the club, scoring 1 goal as they won the 2022 League of Ireland First Division, earning promotion To the Premier Division.

Longford Town
He signed for Longford Town of the League of Ireland First Division on 16 December 2022 for the 2023 season.

International career
Doona made 2 appearances for the Republic of Ireland Under 18's on 28 and 30 November 2015, both against Czech Republic Under 18's.

Career statistics 
Professional appearances – correct as of 17 December 2022.

References

External links
 
 
 

1998 births
Living people
People from The Liberties, Dublin
Association footballers from Dublin (city)
Republic of Ireland association footballers
Stella Maris F.C. players
Crumlin United F.C. players
Shamrock Rovers F.C. players
St Patrick's Athletic F.C. players
Athlone Town A.F.C. players
Cork City F.C. players
League of Ireland players
Association football midfielders
Republic of Ireland youth international footballers